Federico Páez Chiriboga (4 June 1877, Quito – 9 February 1974, Quito) was President of Ecuador 1935–1937.

References

1877 births
1974 deaths
People from Quito
Presidents of Ecuador
Leaders ousted by a coup